Lonny or Lonnie is a given name usually used for males.

People
 Lonny Baxter (born 1979), American former basketball player
 Lonny Bereal, American R&B singer, songwriter and producer
 Lonny Theodore Ted Binion (1943–1998), American casino executive
 Lonny Bohonos (born 1973), Canadian former National Hockey League player
 Lonny Calicchio (born 1972), American football player
 Lonny Chapman (1920–2007), American actor
 Lonny Chin (born 1960), English model and Playboy Playmate of the Month
 Lonnie Chisenhall (born 1988), American baseball player
 Alonzo Clayton (1876–1917), American horse racing jockey
 Lonnie Coleman (1920–1982), American novelist and playwright known for the Beulah Land trilogy
 Lonnie Dennis (born ca. 1938), Canadian football player
 Lonnie Dixon (1932–2011), American collegiate basketball official
 Lonnie Donegan (1931–2002), Scottish skiffle musician known as the King of Skiffle
 Lonnie Ford (born 1979), American football player in the Arena Football League
 Lonnie Franklin (1952-2020), prolific American serial killer and rapist
 Lonny Frey (1910–2009), American Major League Baseball player
 Lonnie Frisbee (1949–1993), American Pentecostal evangelist and mystic
 Lonnie Goldstein (1918–2013), American baseball player
 Lonnie Gordon, American singer and songwriter from the Bronx
 Lonnie Graham, photographer, professor, installation artist and cultural activist
 Lonnie Hammargren (born 1937), American politician
 Lonnie Hanzon (born 1959), American artist based in Colorado
 Lonnie Hillyer (1940–1985), American jazz trumpeter
 Lonnie Holley (born 1950), American artist
 Lonnie Johnson (musician) (1899–1970), American blues and jazz singer, guitarist and songwriter
 Lonnie Johnson (inventor) (born 1949), American engineer and inventor known for the Super Soaker water gun
 Lonnie Johnson (American football) (born 1971), an American football player
 Lonnie Johnson Jr. (born 1995), American football player
 Lonnie Jordan (born 1948), American funk musician, founding member of War
 Lonny Kellner (1930–2003), German singer and actress
 Lonnie C. King, Jr., African-American human rights activist
 Lonnie Kjer (born 1972), (Previously Lonnie Devantier) Danish singer who competed in the Eurovision contest of 1990
 Lonnie D. Kliever (1932–2004), American professor of religious studies
 Lonnie Latham (born 1946), American pastor in Oklahoma
 Lonnie Lee (born 1940), Australian singer
 Lonnie Lee (born 1954), American professional wrestler and author
 Lonnie Loach (born 1968), Canadian ice hockey player
 Lonnie Lynn (born 1943), American basketball player
 Lonny Price (born 1959), American director, actor and writer
 Lonnie Rashid Lynn, Jr. (born 1972), an American hip-hop artist and actor known by the name "Common"
 Lonnie Mack (1941–2016), stage name of American blues-rock guitarist and singer, Lonnie McIntosh
 Lonnie Maclin (born 1967), American baseball player
 Lonnie Marshall, American bassist, singer and songwriter
 Lonnie Marts (born 1968), American football player
 Lonnie Mayne (1944–1978), American professional wrestler
 Lonnie R. Moore (1920–1956), American World War II bomber pilot and Korean War double ace 
 Lonnie McLucas, former Black Panther Party member and convicted murderer
 Lonnie Napier (born 1940), American politician
 Lonnie Nielsen (born 1953), American golfer
 Lonnie Ortega (born 1946), American artist specializing in aviation art
 Lonnie Palelei (born 1971), American football player
 Lonnie Park, musician and front man of Ten Man Push
 Lonnie Perrin (1952–2021), American football player
 Lonnie "Bo" Pilgrim (born 1928), American entrepreneur, founder of Pilgrim's Pride
 Lonnie Pitchford (1955–1998), American blues musician and instrument maker in Mississippi
 Lonnie Plaxico (born 1960), African-American jazz bassist
 Lonnie Quinn (born 1963), American weatherman
 Lonnie Randolph (Indiana politician) (born 1949), American politician
 Lonny Ross (born 1978), American actor and writer
 Lonnie Sanders (born 1941), American football player
 Lonnie Shelton (born 1955), American athlete who played basketball for the New York Knicks
 Lonnie Simmons, American record producer
 Lonnie Smith (born 1955), American baseball outfielder
 Lonnie Smith (organist) (born 1942), American jazz musician
 Lonnie Smith (boxer) (born 1962), American former lightweight champion boxer
 Lonnie Liston Smith (born 1940), American jazz, soul and funk musician
 Lonnie Spragg (1879–1904), rugby union player who represented Australia
 Lonny R. Suko (born 1943), American district judge
 Lonnie Szoke (born 1978), Canadian musician, songwriter and record producer
 Lonnie Thompson (born 1948), American paleoclimatologist
 Lonnie Lee VanZandt (1937–1995), American professor of physics at Purdue University
 Lon Warneke (1909–1976), American baseball player, umpire and judge
 Lonnie Warwick (born 1942), American football player
 Lonnie Wright (1945–2012), American professional basketball and football player
 LeeRoy Yarbrough (1938–1984), American NASCAR race car driver
 Lonnie Young (born 1963), American football player
 Lonnie Youngblood (born 1941), American saxophonist and bandleader
 Lonnie Zamora (1933–2009), New Mexico police officer who reported a UFO

Fictional characters
 Lonnie, a recurring character on Scrubs
 Lonnie, a Horde soldier in She-Ra and the Princesses of Power
 Lonnie, the daughter of Mulan and Li Shang from the Disney film Descendants
 Lonnie Byers, father of Will and Jonathan Byers in Stranger Things
 Lonnie Garamond, titular character in the song "Lonnie" by Godley & Creme
 Lonnie Jamison, a police officer in In the Heat of the Night
 Lonnie Machin, aka Anarky, a DC Comics supervillain
 Lonnie Lincoln, aka Tombstone, a Marvel Comics supervillain
 Lonnie Tallbutt, a character from Freakazoid!, and parody of the Wolf Man

References

German given names
Unisex given names